is a song by Japanese pop singer Eir Aoi. It was released on her official YouTube on February 8, 2018 as her comeback song from her hiatus, before received a physical release together with the song "Ryūsei" on June 13, 2018 as her fourteenth single. It reached number 8 on Oricon and number 10 on Japan Hot 100. The single mark as her first double A-side single.

Release and reception
On 8 February 2018, it was announced that she would resume her activities after her hiatus with the release of the music video  on YouTube. The song itself was released together with the song "Ryūsei" on June 13, 2018 as her fourteenth single on three edition; Regular edition, Limited edition and Limited anime edition. The single reached number 8 on Oricon, and 10 on Japan Hot 100. The song was featured in her fourth album "Fragment".

Music video
The music video for "Yakusoku" was directed by Yūsuke Tanaka.  The video features a lyrics of the song with some footage of Eir Aoi with using blue jacket taking a photo session in the mountain, with some scene featuring a forest and also a mountain

Track listing

Regular edition

Limited edition

Limited anime edition

Personnel
Singer and bands
Eir Aoi – vocals, lyrics ("Ryūsei", "Yakusoku")
Kohei Tsunami, Ryosuke Shigenaga, Katsuhiko Kurosu – lyrics 
Ryosuke Shigenaga – Piano, arranger, other instruments
Hiroki Arai - bass
Takumi Sone – guitar
Taro Yoshida – drums
Tomoe Nakajima, Izumi Taniguchi, Nao Yamada - Violin, viola
Kana Matsuo - Cello

Production
Satoshi Morishige, Nobuyuki Fujiwara – record
Kenichi Koga – mixer

Charts

Release history

References

Eir Aoi songs
2018 singles
2018 songs